Pueblo Nuevo Viñas is a municipality in the Santa Rosa department of Guatemala.

Municipalities of the Santa Rosa Department, Guatemala